The feudal barony of Lenzie was a feudal barony with its caput baronium at an unknown location in East Dunbartonshire, Scotland. The barony was granted to William Comyn, Baron Lenzie in 1170. After the Comyns were disinherited by King Robert the Bruce, the barony was given to the Fleming family after 1306.

Citations

References
Boardman, Steve, et al. The Exercise of Power in Medieval Scotland, C. 1200-1500; Four Courts (2003) 

Barony of Lenzie
Barony of Lenzie
Barony of Lenzie
Lenzie
lenzie
Barony of Lenzie
Lists of British nobility
Barony of Lenzie
Scotland